Peter Carruthers (born 16 June 1952) is a British-American philosopher and cognitive scientist working primarily in the area of philosophy of mind, though he has also made contributions to philosophy of language and ethics. He is a professor of philosophy at the University of Maryland, College Park, an associate member of Neuroscience and Cognitive Science Program, and a member of the Committee for Philosophy and the Sciences.

Education
Before he moved to the University of Maryland in 2001, Carruthers was professor of philosophy at the University of Sheffield, where he founded and directed the Hang Seng Centre for Cognitive Studies and prior to that was a lecturer at University of Essex, Queen's University of Belfast, University of St. Andrews, and University of Oxford. He was educated at the University of Leeds before studying for his D.Phil at University of Oxford under Michael Dummett.

Philosophical work
Carruthers' primary research interests are in philosophy of mind, philosophy of psychology, and cognitive science. He has worked especially on theories of consciousness, the role of natural language in human cognition, and modularity of mind, but has also published on such issues as: the mentality of animals; the nature and status of our folk psychology; nativism (innateness); human creativity; theories of intentional content; and defence of a notion of narrow content for psychological explanation. He is presently working on a book project, tentatively entitled Mind-reading and Meta-cognition, which examines the cognitive basis of our understanding of the minds of others and its relationship to our access to our own minds.  He has also written a book in applied ethics, arguing that animals do not have moral rights.

Notable ideas
The role of language in cognition
There is a spectrum of opinions on the role of language in cognition. At one extreme, philosophers like Michael Dummett have argued that thought is impossible in the absence of language; and social scientists influenced by Benjamin Whorf have believed that the natural languages that people grow up speaking will have a profound influence on the character of their thoughts. At the other extreme, philosophers like Jerry Fodor, together with most cognitive scientists, have believed that language is but an input/output device for cognition, playing no significant role in thought itself. Peter Carruthers has steered a path in between these two extremes. In his 1996 book, he allowed that much thought can and does occur in the absence of language, while arguing for a constitutive role for language in conscious thinking, conducted in "inner speech". In his 2006 book, this position is broadened and deepened. Following Antonio Damasio, he argues that mental rehearsals of action issue in imagery that plays a profound role in human practical reasoning, with inner speech now being seen as a subset of action rehearsal. Carruthers now argues that the serial use of these rehearsals can issue in a whole new level of thinking and reasoning, serving to realize the "dual systems" that psychologists like Daniel Kahneman believe to be involved in human reasoning processes.

Massive modularity of the human mind
Evolutionary psychologists like Leda Cosmides, John Tooby, and Steven Pinker have claimed that the mind consists of a great many distinct functionally specialized systems, or modules. Jerry Fodor has argued, in contrast, that the "central" processes of the mind (judging, reasoning, deciding, and so forth) cannot be modular. In his 2006 book, Peter Carruthers lays out the main case supporting massive modularity, shows how the notion of "module" in this context should properly be understood, and takes up Fodor's challenge by showing how the distinctive flexibility, creativity, and rationality of the human mind can result from the interactions of massive numbers of modules.

Dispositional higher-order thought theory of consciousness
Amongst philosophers who think that consciousness admits of explanation, the most popular approach has been some or other variety of representationalism. Representationalists hold that the distinctive features of consciousness can be explained by appeal to the representational contents (together with the causal roles) of experience. First-order representationalists like Fred Dretske and Michael Tye (philosopher) believe that the relevant contents are world-directed ones (colors, sounds, and so forth) of a distinctive sort (non-conceptual, analog, or fine-grained). Higher-order representationalists like William Lycan, David M. Rosenthal, and Peter Carruthers, in contrast, maintain that we need to be aware of undergoing these first-order experiences in order for the latter to qualify as conscious. On Carruthers' view, the awareness in question is dispositional. By virtue of an experience being available to higher-order thought, it is claimed to acquire a higher-order non-conceptual content. Hence, conscious experiences have a dual content: while representing the world to us, they also represent themselves to us. Conscious experiences are thus held to be self-representational ones.

The denial of introspection for thoughts
Most people (philosophers and non-philosophers alike) assume that they have direct introspective access to their own propositional attitude events of judging, deciding, and so forth. We think of ourselves as knowing our own thought processes immediately, without having to interpret ourselves (in the way that we do need to interpret the behavior and circumstances of other people if we are to know what they are thinking). In a series of recent papers Peter Carruthers has argued that this introspective intuition is illusory. While allowing that we do have introspective access to our own experiences, including imagistic experiences of the sort that occur during "inner speech", he draws on evidence from across the cognitive sciences to argue that our knowledge of our own judgments and decisions results from us turning our interpretative skills upon ourselves. He also argues that while inner speech plays important roles in human cognition, it never plays the right sort of role to constitute a judgment, or a decision. The latter processes always occur below the surface of consciousness, Carruthers claims.

Selected publications
 The Animals Issue. Moral Theory in Practice (1992). Cambridge University Press: .
 Theories of Theories of Mind. Co-editor (with Peter K Smith), (1996). Cambridge University Press. .
 Language and Thought: interdisciplinary themes. Co-editor (with Jill Boucher), (1998). Cambridge University Press. .
 Evolution and the Human Mind: modularity, language and meta-cognition. Co-editor (with Andrew Chamberlain), (2000). Cambridge University Press. 
 The Cognitive Basis of Science. Co-editor (with Stephen Stich and Michael Siegal), (2002). Cambridge University Press. 
 The Innate Mind: volume 1 structure and contents. Co-editor (with Stephen Laurence and Stephen Stich), (2005). Oxford University Press. .
 The Innate Mind: volume 2: culture and cognition. Co-editor (with Stephen Laurence and Stephen Stich), (2006). Oxford University Press. .
 The Innate Mind: volume 3: foundations and the future. Co-editor (with Stephen Laurence and Stephen Stich), (2007). Oxford University Press. .
 Language, Thought and Consciousness: an essay in philosophical psychology (1996). Cambridge University Press: .
 The Philosophy of Psychology (1999). Cambridge University Press: .
 Phenomenal Consciousness: a naturalistic theory (2000). Cambridge University Press: .
  The Nature of the Mind: an introduction (2004). Routledge:  (paperback)  (hardcover)
 Consciousness: essays from a higher-order perspective (2005). Oxford University Press.: 
 The Architecture of the Mind: massive modularity and the flexibility of thought (2006). Oxford University Press: 
 The Opacity of Mind: an integrative theory of self-knowledge (2011). Oxford University Press: . 
 The Centered Mind: What the Science of Working Memory Shows Us About the Nature of Human Thought (2015). Oxford University Press: .

Notes

References
 Curriculum Vitae – University of Maryland

External links
 Peter Carruthers' web site, including full text versions of some of his books.
 Interview at 3AM Magazine

1952 births
20th-century American philosophers
20th-century British philosophers
21st-century American philosophers
21st-century British philosophers
Action theorists
American ethicists
Analytic philosophers
British ethicists
British consciousness researchers and theorists
Critics of animal rights
Living people
Philosophers of language
Philosophers of mind
Philosophers of psychology
Philosophers of science